Bobst may refer to:
 Elmer Holmes Bobst Library (aka "Bobst"), the main library at New York University in Manhattan, New York City, New York State, USA 
 Bobst SA, a Swiss packaging machinery and servicing company
 Elmer Holmes Bobst (1884–1978), a U.S. businessman and philanthropist

See also
 Bobst Boy, nickname of Steven Stanzak (born 1984), NYU student who was found living in the basement of the Bobst